Elizabeth Bachman Moore (born February 27, 1982) is an American attorney and former  member of the Georgia House of Representatives from the 95th District, serving from 2019 to 2023. She is a member of the Democratic Party. At the time Moore represented the 95th District it included the cities of Peachtree Corners, Berkeley Lake, Duluth, Norcross, and Johns Creek. The district included citizens of both Gwinnett and Fulton counties. As of 2022, District 95 was changed to a completely different area south of Snellville and north of Stonecrest and Conyers.

Moore choose not to seek re-election in Georgia House District 95 and led an unsuccessful bid for an open seat in Georgia Senate District 7. She lost to Senator Nabilah Islam by only 78 votes.

Georgia State House of Representatives

2019-2020 committee assignments
 Georgia State House Committee on Energy, Utilities, and Telecommunications
 Georgia State House Committee on Banks and Banking
 Georgia State House Committee on Science and Technology
 Georgia State House Committee on Information and Audits

2019-2020 caucus and delegations memberships 
 Gwinnett County House Delegation, Secretary
 Fulton County House Delegation
 State House Democratic Caucus
 State Legislative Women's Caucus
 State Legislative Entertainment Caucus
 State House Technology, Innovation, and Entrepreneurship Caucus

Electoral history

2020

2018

Personal life 
Moore lives in Peachtree Corners, Georgia. She first attended Wesleyan School in Peachtree Corners for high school. She subsequently earned her dual undergraduate degrees in Psychology and German from the University of Georgia in 2004 and her J.D. degree from Georgia State University College of Law in 2011. She divorced Lorie Moore in 2021. She owns her own entertainment law practice, the Beth B Moore Law Firm, that operates out of Peachtree Corners.

References

Living people
People from Peachtree Corners, Georgia
University of Georgia alumni
Georgia State University College of Law alumni
Democratic Party members of the Georgia House of Representatives
Women state legislators in Georgia (U.S. state)
21st-century American politicians
21st-century American women politicians
1982 births